Puviarasu or Puviyarasu, born. 1930), is a Tamil poet and translator from Tamil Nadu, India.

Biography
Puviyarasu was born in a village near Udumalpet. His birth name was S. Jagannathan. Puviyarasu is the Tamil translation of the Sanskritic "Jagannathan". His family moved to and settled in Coimbatore. He obtained his intermediate degree from Government Arts College, Coimbatore and his Tamil Vidwan degree from Perur Tamil College. He worked as a Tamil teacher for more than thirty years. He first started publishing in 1952. He is a Marxist by political orientation and is an opponent of Dravidian parties. He was imprisoned for his participation in agitations for making Tamil the administrative language of Tamil Nadu and the border agitations. He was one of the founders of the short-lived Vanambadi literary movement. In his literary career he has published more than 80 books. He has also translated the works of Shakespeare, Khalil Gibran, Omar Khayyam, Osho, Dostoevsky and Rabindranath Tagore into Tamil. Some of his poems have been translated into English, Russian, Hungarian, Malayalam, Kannada, Hindi and Sinhalese. In 2007 he won the Sahitya Akademi Translation Prize for his poem Puratchikaaran - translation of Kazi Nazrul Islam's The Revolutionary. In 2010, he was awarded the Sahitya Akademi Award for Tamil for his poetry collection Kaioppam (lit. The Signature). The charitable trust Puviyarasu Tamil Valarchi Mayyam (started for training Tamil teachers properly) has been named after him. He currently lives in Coimbatore.

Partial bibliography

Poetry
Kaioppam
Ettu thisai kaatru
Kavithaikenna Kelvi
Meendum zen kavithaikal
 Idu dhan
 Vaasippu

Translations
The Book of  Mirdad by Mikha'il Na'ima
The Brothers Karamazov by Fyodor Dostoevsky
Hamlet
Othello
Romeo and Juliet

Drama
Manidhan
Moondram pirai

Awards and recognitions
Sahitya Akademi Translation Prize (2007)
Kalaignar Porkizhi Award (2008)
Sahitya Akademi Award for Tamil (2009)
Sahitya Puraskar Award from Kerala Cultural Centre

Books 
His books are available as ebooks at Pustaka.

References

1930 births
Living people
20th-century Indian poets
20th-century Indian translators
Recipients of the Sahitya Akademi Award in Tamil
Tamil writers
Poets from Tamil Nadu
Indian Tamil people
20th-century Indian dramatists and playwrights
People from Tiruppur district
Translators to Tamil
Dramatists and playwrights from Tamil Nadu
Recipients of the Sahitya Akademi Prize for Translation